Mike Stevens (born October 13, 1950) is a Canadian former professional ice hockey defenseman who played in the World Hockey Association (WHA).

Early life 
Stevens was born in Winnipeg, Manitoba. He played college hockey for the Minnesota Duluth Bulldogs at the University of Minnesota Duluth.

Career 
Stevens was drafted in the fifth round of the 1970 NHL Amateur Draft by the St. Louis Blues. He played parts of two WHA seasons with the Phoenix Roadrunners and Houston Aeros. Stevens ended his career with the Oklahoma City Blazers.

References

External links

1950 births
Living people
Canadian ice hockey defencemen
Denver Spurs (WHL) players
Houston Aeros (WHA) players
Ice hockey people from Winnipeg
Minnesota Duluth Bulldogs men's ice hockey players
Oklahoma City Blazers (1965–1977) players
Phoenix Roadrunners (WHA) players
St. Louis Blues draft picks
Tucson Mavericks players
Canadian expatriate ice hockey players in the United States